The Bewani River is a river in Western New Guinea, Indonesia.

See also
List of rivers of Western New Guinea

References

Rivers of Papua (province)